Trollech is a Czech band from Plzeň that plays black metal (Viking metal) music. The band was formed by Lord Morbivod and Asura Godwar Gorgon's Ray in 1999 and started performing live but did not release its first album until 2001. This album's genre has been labelled as "forest pagan black metal". The lyrics throughout are in Czech and apparently follow set themes revolving around forests, trees, castles, trolls, dwarfs, weather (thunderstorms, rain) and other natural entities in the mystical realm of Trollech, of which the musicians act as guardians.

Trollech's music is considered to be old-school pagan metal, especially their earlier albums. Their simple, yet melodic music provides support to the lyrics, the main quality of the band. Trollech uses Czech in a playful way, including frequent usage of archaic-sounding and unusual words.

Band members 
Morbivod – guitar, screams
Asura Godwar Gorgon's Ray – bass, shrieks, jaw harp
Throllmas – guitar, vocals
Sheafraidh – drums

Former members 
Johannes – guitar (2001–2006)

Discography 
 Main releases
 Ve hvozdech... (2001)
 Synové lesů (2002)
 V rachotu hromů (2003)
 Skryti v mlze (2006)
 Jasmuz (2010)
 Vnitřní tma (2012)
 Každý strom má svůj stín (2017)
 Live albums
 Svatoboj (Metal Swamp no. 22) (2006)
 Compilation albums
 Ve hvozdech & Synové lesů (2010)
 EPs
 Tváře stromů (2003)
 Demos
 Dech pohanských větrů (1999)

References

External links 

Czech black metal musical groups
Musical groups established in 1999
Musical quartets
1999 establishments in the Czech Republic